thumb|Double crescent beach, part of the Ormara Turtle Beaches
Ormara Turtle Beaches is a 10 km stretch of sandy beach along the Balochistan coast in Pakistan. Covering an area of 2,400 hectares, it was designated a Ramsar Site (No. 1070) on 10 May 2001. It is one of the largest turtle nesting sites along the coast of Pakistan. The main branch of the local population's economy is food and commercial fishing.

Flora 
Vegetation consists mainly of salt-resistant plants that can grow in scarce freshwater conditions.

Fauna 
A considerable number of marine turtles are supported here including the endangered olive ridley and green turtles. It is  possible that the hawksbill turtle is also supported. There are no significant numbers of migratory birds.

Threats
The capture of turtles for export and the accumulation of plastic debris.

References

Beaches of Pakistan
Marine parks of Pakistan
Natural history of Balochistan, Pakistan
Landforms of Balochistan (Pakistan)
Ramsar sites in Pakistan
Ormara